The Warriors may refer to:

Fiction
 The Warriors, also known as The Dark Avenger, a 1955 film starring Errol Flynn
 The Warriors (Yurick novel), a 1965 novel by Sol Yurick
 The Warriors (film), a 1979 film, directed by Walter Hill and based on the Sol Yurick novel
 The Warriors (video game), a 2005 video game based on the 1979 film
 The Warriors: Street Brawl, a 2009 video game also based on the 1979 film, but unrelated to the 2005 title
 The Warriors (Jakes novel), a 1977 novel by John Jakes
 Musa (film), a 2001 South Korean film that is called The Warrior in English-speaking countries
 The Warriors (Doctor Who audio), a Big Finish Productions audio drama
 The Warriors (TV series), an Australian television comedy drama series
 Warriors (novel series), a series of young adult novels by Erin Hunter published starting in 2003
 Warriors (arc), the first story arc in the series

Sports
 The New Zealand Warriors (formerly the Auckland Warriors), a professional rugby league team
 The Wigan Warriors, a professional rugby league team based in Wigan, England
 The Golden State Warriors, an NBA team
 The Moose Jaw Warriors, a major junior ice hockey team based in Canada.
 Stenhousemuir F.C., a Scottish association football club, nicknamed "The Warriors"
 Warriors (cricket team), the name used by the combined Eastern Province and Border first class cricket teams in South Africa
 Warriors RC, a Finnish rugby club in Helsinki

Music
 The Warriors: An Imaginary Ballet, a work for orchestra and two pianos composed by Percy Grainger
 The Warriors (American band), a hardcore punk band
 The Warriors (British band), a Beatles inspired rock band
 Warriors (band), a Yugoslav heavy metal band
 "The Warriors", a song by Royce da 5'9" featuring Slaughterhouse from Street Hop
 The Warriors (soundtrack), the soundtrack to the 1979 film The Warriors
 The Warriors EP, a 1999 EP by P.O.D.

See also 
 Warrior (disambiguation)